

Taylors Wines is a family-owned winery established in 1969 which is located in the Clare Valley of South Australia. Taylors is one of the founding members of the Australia's First Families of Wine.

Taylors' first wine was the 1973 Taylors Cabernet Sauvignon which was awarded a gold medal at every Australian national wine show where it was entered, since then Taylors Wines has grown to become the largest holding in the Clare Valley. Due to trademark restrictions Taylors Wines trades as Wakefield Wines in the majority of the Northern Hemisphere.

History
The original 178-hectare vineyard was founded in 1969 by Bill Taylor (Snr) and his sons, Bill and John and is still run by the family today. The original vineyard is located by the Wakefield River in the Clare Valley, South Australia.

Seahorses
The three Seahorse logo of Taylors and Wakefield wines came through a discovery in the vineyard. While excavating the vineyard dam, the family found fossilised remains of little Seahorses, signifying the area had once been part of an inland sea Today, the three seahorses represent the three generations of Taylors winemakers.

Clare Valley
The Clare Valley is "Situated in the northern Mt Lofty Ranges. South Australia's Clare Valley was settled in the late 1830s, with the first vineyards planted and wines produced in the early 1840s" The region is home to a large number of vineyards and grows a wide variety of grape varieties though it is renowned for its Riesling, Cabernet Sauvignon and Shiraz. South Australia has the most wine activity of all the states in Australia.

Vineyard

The Taylor family vineyard is located in the Clare Valley, more specifically in the sub-region of Auburn, and stretches to the Watervale border. "It is 350 meters above sea level and the climate is often described as Mediterranean due to the cool maritime breezes originating from the Gulf of St Vincent – situated only 60 kilometres to the West."

Ranges
Taylors Wines has six different ranges all of which have different wine varietals and blends.

Varietals
Shiraz, Cabernet Sauvignon, Tempranillo, Merlot, Pinot noir, Cabernet Merlot, Sauvignon blanc, Semillon, Riesling, Chardonnay, Gewurztraminer, Vermentino and Pinot gris.

Australia's First Families of Wine
"Launched in 2009 Australia's First Families of Wine (AFFW) is an initiative created by 12 family owned Australian wineries to educate consumers about Australian wine. Together the families represent 16 Australian regions across four states and more than 1200 years of winemaking experience."

Environment
Taylors Wines has won multiple awards for its environmental initiatives and sustainability practices. In 2010 Taylors Wines won the Banksia Environmental Foundation Award for sustainability. In the same year the company also won the Environmental and Energy Management Award in the NAB Agribusiness Awards and is the first company to release a range of 100% carbon neutral wines compliant to the international standard for Life Cycle Assessment (ISO14044).

Other awards won by Taylors Wines due to their environmental practices include:
Winner of the Best Green Launch – 2010 The Drinks Business Magazine Green Awards
Carter Holt Harvey Sustainability Award – Silver Medal – 2010 Australian Packaging Awards

Awards
Taylors Wines has received multiple international awards for its wines. "To date the company has won more than 3300 medals including 44 Trophies, 327 Gold and 819 Silver Medals"
The vineyard was also given the highest rating of five red stars by James Halliday in the 2012 Wine Companion

Community Initiatives

St Andrews Hospital
Taylors Wines has been associated with the St Andrews Hospital in South Australia since 1990.

Art Gallery of New South Wales
Taylors Wines has been a sponsor of the Art Gallery of New South Wales Society of NSW for over 15 years. The Art Gallery of New South Wales is the leading museum of art in New South Wales and is one of Australia's foremost Cultural Institutions

The Wallabies – Australia's National Rugby Union Team
Taylors Wines are the official wine behind Australia's national rugby union team, the Wallabies, and the exclusive wine partner of the Rugby Union Players' Association (RUPA).

See also
Australian wine
South Australian wine

References

External links

australiasfirstfamiliesofwine.com.au
redkite.org.au
wakefieldwines.com

Wineries in South Australia
Privately held companies of Australia
Family-owned companies of Australia
Australian companies established in 1969
Food and drink companies established in 1969